Magomedov, also Magomadov (Cyrillic:Магомедов or Магомадов, Masculine, Pronunciation:Muhammad) or Magomedova (Magomadova, Feminine) is a predominantly Chechen and Dagestani surname. It is derived from the male given name Magomed (equivalent of Arabic given name Muhammad) and literally means Magomed's. It may refer to:

 Apti Magomedov (born 1968), Moldovan judoka of Chechen descent
 Chingiz Magomadov (born 1998), Russian football player
 Fariza Magomadova (born 1925), Russian teacher of Chechen descent
 Ishref Magomedov (born 1980), Russian football player
 Khadzhimurad Magomedov (born 1974), Russian wrestler, Olympic and World champion
 Magomed Magomedov (born 1982), retired professional Russian kickboxer and martial artist
 Magomed Gadjievich Magomedov (1957–2013), Russian judge
 Magomed Magomedov (footballer, born 1987), Russian football player
 Magomed Magomedov (footballer, born 1997), Russian football player
 Magomedali Magomedov, chairman of the State Council of the Republic of Dagestan from 1987 to 2006
 Magomedsalam Magomedov (born 1964), the President of Dagestan, a federal subject of the Russian Federation in the North Caucasus
 Murad Magomedov (born 1973), Russian-Azerbaijan-Israeli football player
 Ramazan Magomedov, Belarusian amateur boxer
 Rashid Magomedov (born 1984), Russian amateur boxer &  mixed martial artist
 Ruslan Magomedov (born 1986), Russian mixed martial artist
 Umalat Magomedov (born 1979), former leader of the militant Shariat Jamaat organisation in Dagestan
 Valiabdula Magomedov (born 1986), Russian professional football player
 Ziyavudin Magomedov (born 1968), Russian businessman